The Fire Services Exemplary Service Medal is a service medal created in 1985 by the Canadian monarch-in-Council. The medal recognizes members of recognized Canadian fire services who had served for 20 years, ten years of which have been served in the performance of duties involving potential risks. A bar, bearing a maple leaf in silver, is given for each additional 10 years served. The medal is awarded by the Chancellery of Canadian Orders.

Description
The Fire Services Exemplary Service Medal is circular medal made of silver coloured metal.  The obverse of the medal depicts a fire hydrant with crossed axes and a Maltese Cross centred on a stylized maple leaf.  Circumscribed around the maple leaf are the words EXEMPLARY SERVICE • SERVICES DISTINGUÉS.  The reverse bears the Royal Cipher.  The Medal is suspended by a ribbon of five equal stripes three red and two gold.

Subsequent awards of the medal are denoted by a plain silver bar with a maple leaf in the centre, attached to the medal's suspension ribbon.  When worn as an undress ribbon individuals who have been awarded a bar to the medal indicate this by wearing a silver maple leaf on the centre of the ribbon.

See also
 Canadian order of precedence (decorations and medals)

References

Civil awards and decorations of Canada
Fire service awards and honors
Long and Meritorious Service Medals of Britain and the Commonwealth